Robert John Gorinski (born January 7, 1952) is a retired Major League Baseball outfielder and designated hitter. He played one season for the Minnesota Twins, with a .195 batting average.

Gorinski is a native of Calumet, Pennsylvania and a graduate of Mount Pleasant Area High School in 1970. Gorinski was selected by the Minnesota Twins in the 1st round (22nd pick overall) of the 1970 Major League Baseball Draft. He made his Major League Baseball debut on April 10, 1977 for the Minnesota Twins.

Minor leagues
Gorinski began his professional career in the Gulf Coast League in 1970. That season, while playing with the Sarasota Twins, he led the league with 6 home runs. By 1972, Gorinski advanced to playing Single-A baseball in the  Carolina League with the Twins' affiliate in Lynchburg. There he led the league with 23 home runs. The following year in 1974, he led the Southern League, while with the Orlando Twins, with 23 home runs and 100 RBIs. In 1976, he led the Pacific Coast League with 28 home runs and 110 RBIs, while with the Tacoma Twins.

Major Leagues
In the 35th annual Baseball Hall of Fame Game, Minnesota scored three runs late for an 8-5 win over the Philadelphia Phillies. Gorinski belted a three-run home run in the top of the sixth inning to even the game at 5-5. Gorinski also collected a fourth-inning RBI double His jersey number was 35 during his time with the Twins.

Family
Bob is the nephew of Walt Gorinski, a professional football player who played in 1946 with the Pittsburgh Steelers of the National Football League.

Stats

Batting stats

References

External links

1952 births
Living people
Minnesota Twins players
People from Latrobe, Pennsylvania
Baseball players from Pennsylvania
Major League Baseball outfielders
Gulf Coast Twins players
Wisconsin Rapids Twins players
Lynchburg Twins players
Orlando Twins players
Tacoma Twins players
Denver Bears players
Tidewater Tides players
Toledo Mud Hens players
Wichita Aeros players
American people of Polish descent